Jake Thomas (born January 30, 1990) is an American actor and director, perhaps best known for his role as Matt McGuire, the title character's younger brother, in the Disney Channel show Lizzie McGuire (2001–04). In 2002, he won a Young Artist Award for supporting actor for his performance in A.I. Artificial Intelligence (2001). He also appeared in Cory in the House (2007–08), playing the role of Jason Stickler.

Biography
Thomas was born in Knoxville, Tennessee, the son of Kim Simmons Thomas, a television reporter and writer, and Bob Thomas, a radio personality, actor and writer. The youngest of three children, he has two older siblings. Thomas attended Farragut High School, and graduated from California State University, Northridge with a degree in screenwriting and Japanese.

He is best known for his role as Matt McGuire, the younger brother on Lizzie McGuire, which ran from 2001 to 2004 on Disney Channel. He was set to reprise the role in the series’ continuation on Disney+ although the show was later cancelled in December 2020 before it could be released.

Thomas has appeared in numerous television shows and movies, including playing Eric Miller in the Without a Trace episode "Wannabe", a young Hugh Hefner in the television movie Hefner: Unauthorized, 3rd Rock from the Sun and had a recurring role in Cory in the House as Jason Stickler. 
Thomas also works as a commercial photographer and director.

Thomas travels between Los Angeles and Knoxville, Tennessee.

Filmography

Film

Television

Video game

References

External links

1990 births
Living people
American male child actors
American male film actors
American male television actors
Male actors from Tennessee
Farragut High School alumni
People from Knoxville, Tennessee
20th-century American male actors
21st-century American male actors